Waliur Rahman Bhuiyan  (2 July 1952 – 19 June 2020) was a Bangladeshi businessman.

Early life 
Bhuiyan was born in 1952. He did two master's degrees, in economics and business administration from the University of Dhaka.

Career
Bhuiyan joined Linde Bangladesh Limited in 1975.

Bhuiyan was the managing director and country head of Linde Bangladesh Limited (formerly, BOC Bangladesh Ltd.) from 1998 to May 2011. He retired in 2011 over health reasons.

An active member of the business community, Bhuiyan sat on the boards of the Chittagong Stock Exchange, the International Chamber of Commerce and the Bangladesh Employers' Federation. He was the president of the Foreign Investors' Chamber of Commerce and Industry (FICCI) of Bangladesh from 1999 to 2003.

In November 2007, he joined the board of Advanced Chemical Industries (ACI) Limited.

On 25 February 2008, he was appointed to the newly formed board of directors of Bangladesh Biman by the Caretaker government.

Bhuiyan has been Advisor of Robi Axiata Limited since August 2011.

In 2007, Bhuiyan was appointed an honorary Officer of the Order of the British Empire (OBE) for his achievements and services towards strengthening UK-Bangladesh business relations.

Personal life
Bhuiyan married Sajeda Rahman, and had one daughter and one son.

Death 
Bhuiyan died on 19 June 2020.

See also
 British Bangladeshi
 Business of British Bangladeshis
 List of British Bangladeshis

References

1952 births
Bangladeshi businesspeople
University of Dhaka alumni
Officers of the Order of the British Empire
2020 deaths